Storehouse No. 3 is one of four historic storehouses built by the United States Army along the Portland Canal on the west coast of North America.  Built out of rubble stone in 1896, they were built at a time of tension with neighboring Canada over exact location of the international border in the area.  The border location was resolved by arbitration in 1903, with two of the four warehouses falling in Canadian territory.  None of the warehouses were apparently ever used.  Storehouse No. 3 is located on Halibut Bay, on the northwest side of the Portland Canal.  The storehouse was listed on the National Register of Historic Places in 1977.

See also
Storehouse No. 4, which is also in US territory near Hyder
National Register of Historic Places listings in Ketchikan Gateway Borough, Alaska

References

Military facilities on the National Register of Historic Places in Alaska
Commercial buildings completed in 1896
Buildings and structures on the National Register of Historic Places in Ketchikan Gateway Borough, Alaska